The United States deputy secretary of agriculture is the second-highest-ranking official in the United States Department of Agriculture, appointed by the President with the advice and consent of the Senate. The deputy secretary becomes acting secretary of agriculture in the event of the Secretary's resignation, death, or otherwise inability to fulfill the duties of the position. The deputy secretary performs whatever duties are prescribed to him or her by the secretary of agriculture. The deputy secretary of agriculture is paid at level II of the Executive Schedule.

The position of deputy secretary of agriculture was originally called the under secretary of agriculture, until the title was changed in 1976.  Previous Deputy Secretaries by recency include Chuck Conner (September 2005–January 2009), Jim Moseley  (August 2001 – April 2005), Richard Rominger (May 1993 – January 2001), Ann Veneman (1991–1993), and Jack Parnell (1989–1991). On July 13, 2017, President Donald Trump announced his intent to nominate Stephen Censky, the CEO of the American Soybean Association, as deputy secretary. Censky was confirmed by the U.S. Senate on October 3, 2017, and served until November, 2020. Jewel H. Bronaugh has served as the senate-confirmed Deputy Secretary from her confirmation on May 13, 2021 until March 2023. She is the first African-American to serve as Deputy Secretary.

Two Deputy Secretaries have gone on to head the Department of Agriculture, Ann Veneman and Richard Lyng.

List of deputy secretaries of agriculture
 denotes Acting Deputy Secretary

 Parties
 (5)
 (5)

References

United States Department of Agriculture officials
Agriculture